Bodil Valero (born as Bodil Lundström 14 May 1958, before June 2015 Bodil Ceballos) is a Swedish politician who served as a Member of the European Parliament (MEP) from 2014 until 2019. She is a member of the Green Party, part of the European Green Party. In parliament, Valero served as the green coordinator in the Security and Defence Committee (SEDE).

She also served a member of the Committee on Civil Liberties, Justice and Home Affairs (LIBE) and the Delegation to the ACP-EU Joint Parliamentary Assembly (DACP) and as substitute in the Committee on Foreign Affairs (AFET), the Delegation for relations with the countries of Central America (DCAM) and the Delegation to the Euro-Latin American Parliamentary Assembly (DLAT)

In addition to her committee assignments, Valero served as vice-chairwoman of the European Parliament Intergroup on the Western Sahara.

Profile issues

Valero works with the rights of refugees and migrants and for legal roads in the EU. She advocates an open and humane migration policy and has criticized the EU's Migration Policy Agreement with Turkey, in favor of Member States sharing responsibility for refugee reception.

Valero has been committed to minority rights, including Kurds, Assyrians / Syrians and Romans.

From 2014, she was the green representative in the negotiations on the European Parliament's annual report on Turkey's accession negotiations.

As reporter for the European Parliament's Annual Report on Arms Export.

References

1958 births
Living people
MEPs for Sweden 2014–2019
21st-century women MEPs for Sweden
Green Party (Sweden) MEPs
People from Jönköping